The Museum of Western Art in Kerrville, Texas, is an art museum dedicated to the paintings and sculptures of contemporary artists of the American West who follow in the tradition of Frederic Remington and Charles M. Russell. In addition to the rotating collection, the museum also has an extensive western research library and Journey West children's gallery. The museum uses the motto "Where the Legend Lives".

History
The museum opened on April 23, 1983 as the Cowboy Artists of America Museum, intended to serve as the headquarters of the Cowboy Artists of America. The building was designed by the late O'Neil Ford, a pioneer in the Southwestern style of architecture. In 2004, the Masel S. Quinn Pavilion of the Western Art Academy was completed for use in ongoing education programs.

A subsequent dispute led to the dissolution of formal ties between the museum and the association, and the museum changed its name to the National Center for American Western Art and then to The Museum of Western Art in 2003.  

Features

The museum's exterior features a rugged hacienda-type exterior and manicured grounds graced by larger-than-lifesize western sculptures. The 14,000 square foot of interior space house an impressive permanent collection of paintings and sculptures, all done by past and present renowned western artists. Distinctive handcrafted boveda ceilings, end-cut mesquite and Saltillo tile flooring combine with a multitude of western artifacts and priceless art to leave a lasting impression on all who visit. In addition to three indoor galleries, an extensive western research library, the Journey West Children's gallery and a museum store.  An outdoor pavilion is used frequently for special events, wedding receptions, corporate gatherings, reunions and educational classes. 

Awards and Recognitions

The museum has received recognition as one of the top western art museums in the U.S. by True West Magazine in 2021 and 2022. It has also been rated by a reader poll of The Kerrville Daily Times as the Top Attraction in Kerrville for 2021 and 2022.

Location

Located five miles off I-10, exit 508, the museum is an hour's drive northwest of San Antonio. Regular hours are Tuesday - Saturday, 10 a.m. to 4 p.m. Admission rates listed on website, www.museumofwesternart.com. Current and retired military always complimentary when military i.d. is presented.

See also
Museums in Texas
Museums in Central Texas

References

External links
Museum of Western Art - official site

Museums in Kerr County, Texas
Art museums and galleries in Texas
American West museums in Texas
Western art
Art museums established in 1983
1983 establishments in Texas